The 1954 All-SEC football team consists of American football players selected to the All-Southeastern Conference (SEC) chosen by various selectors for the 1954 college football season. Ole Miss won the conference.

All-SEC selections

Ends
Jim Pyburn, Auburn (AP-1, UP)
Henry Hair, Georgia Tech (AP-1, UP)
Joe O'Malley, Georgia (AP-2)
Joe Tuminello, LSU (AP-2)
Howard Schnellenberger, Kentucky (AP-3)
Ray Brown, Florida (AP-3)

Tackles
Sid Fournet, LSU (AP-1, UP)
Darris McCord, Tennessee (AP-2, UP) 
Rex Boggan, Ole Miss (AP-1)
Frank D'Agostino, Auburn (AP-2)
George Mason, Alabama (AP-3)
Pud Mosteller, Georgia (AP-3)

Guards
Franklin Brooks, Georgia Tech (AP-1, UP)
Bobby Goodall, Vanderbilt (AP-1, UP)
Don Shea, Georgia (AP-2)
Bryan Borathorne, Tulane (AP-2)
George Atkins, Auburn (AP-3)
Bill Dooley, Miss. St. (AP-3)

Centers
Larry Morris, Georgia Tech (AP-2, UP)
Hal Easterwood, Miss. St. (AP-1)
Steve DeLaTore, Florida (AP-3)

Quarterbacks
Eagle Day, Ole Miss (AP-2, UP)
Bob Hardy, Kentucky (AP-1)
Bobby Freeman, Auburn (AP-3)

Halfbacks 
 Art Davis, Miss. St. (AP-1, UP)
 Tom Tracy, Tennessee (AP-1, UP [as fb])
 Corky Tharp, Alabama (AP-2, UP)
 Allen Muirhead, Ole Miss (AP-2)
 Charley Horton, Vanderbilt (AP-3)
 Jimmy Thompson, Georgia Tech (AP-3)

Fullbacks
Joe Childress, Auburn (AP-1)
Mal Hammack, Florida (AP-2)
 Bobby Garrad, Georgia (AP-3)

Key

AP = Associated Press.

UP = United Press.

Bold = Consensus first-team selection by both AP and UP

See also
1954 College Football All-America Team

References

All-SEC
All-SEC football teams